D. James Goodwin is an American record producer, recording engineer, musician, and filmmaker, based in New York. Goodwin is known for his experimental and irreverent approach to recording. His discography includes bands and artists such as Kaki King.

Limited discography

Bonny Light Horseman - self titled - 37d03d
Muzz - self titled - Matador Records 
Heather Woods Broderick - Invitation - Western Vinyl
Craig Finn - I Need a New War - Partisan
Kevin Morby - Oh My God - Dead Oceans
Bob Weir – Blue Mountain – Sony Music
Craig Finn – We All Want the Same Things – Partisan Records
Whitney – Light Upon the Lake – Jagjaguwar
Kevin Morby – Singing Saw – Dead Oceans
Tim Berne – You've Been Watching Me – ECM Records
David Torn – Only Sky – ECM
Uni Ika Ai – Keeping a Golden Bullseye in the Corner of My Mind – Zen Squid
Craig Finn – Faith in the Future – Partisan
BOBBY – Bobby – Partisan
Kelli Scarr – Danglin' teeth – Silence Breaks
Rubik – Solar – Fullsteam Records
Matt White – It's the Good Crazy – Ryko
Natasha Bedingfield – Strip Me – Sony
Devo – Something for Everybody – Warner
Trouble Andrew – (in progress) – Virgin
The Bravery – Stir the Blood – Island/Def Jam
Lapko – A New Bohemia – Fullsteam
Camphor – Drawn to Dust – Friendly Fire Recordings
New London Fire – Happiness Through Radios and Wires – (self-released)
New London Fire – I Sing the Body Holographic – Eyeball Records
Donna Lewis – In the Pink – Peruzzi Music
Thursday – "Ever Fallen in Love (With Someone You Shouldn't've)" – Tony Hawk's American Wasteland (soundtrack) – Vagrant Records
Baumer – Were It Not For You – Eyeball Records
Kiss Kiss – Reality vs. the Optimist – Eyeball
Murder by Death – Who Will Survive, and What Will Be Left of Them? – Eyeball
Pompeii – Assembly – Eyeball
Stiffed – Burned Again – Outlook Music
Electric Century – Electric Century – Panic State Records

References

https://tapeop.com/interviews/138/d-james-goodwin/

External links
 official website

American audio engineers
Living people
Place of birth missing (living people)
Year of birth missing (living people)
People from Woodstock, New York
Engineers from New York (state)